The Left of North Rhine-Westphalia (Die Linke Nordrhein-Westfalen, usually written DIE LINKE.NRW) is the chapter of the Left Party in the German federal state of North Rhine-Westphalia.

History

Past history

The WASG in North Rhine-Westphalia 
Labour and Social Justice – The Electoral Alternative (Wahlalternative Arbeit und soziale Gerechtigkeit e.V., also called the WASG) was founded in Berlin on 3 July 2004, and its first North Rhine-Westphalia-wide General Assembly took place in Duisburg on 17 October 2004. From this association, a political party was formed at the national level on 22 January 2005, with the North Rhine-Westphalia chapter coming into existence just four days later, on 26 January 2005. The spokesperson was Hüseyin Kenan Aydin.

The North Rhine-Westphalia chapter received national attention because it was in this state that the party first ran for seats in the Landtag, or state parliament. A state conference in Düsseldorf on 23 January 2005 chose 40 candidates for the state reserve party list, with the Herne city party leader Jürgen Klute chosen as the lead candidate. With the North Rhine-Westphalia state election of 2005, the WASG immediately became the fifth largest party in the state, but as it only garnered 2.2% of the vote (well below the 5% threshold required to enter parliament), they did not receive any seats. The party entered this election still in direct competition to the ideologically similar Party of Democratic Socialism (PDS), with whom they  would cooperate in later elections.

On the 25 and 26 of March 2006, the first state convention of the group as a political party took place in Dortmund.

PDS in North Rhine-Westphalia 
The Party of Democratic Socialism (PDS) ran candidates in both the 2000 and 2005 state elections in North Rhine-Westphalia, garnering 1.1% and 0.9% of the votes, respectively.

The Left in North Rhine-Westphalia 
The Left Party came into existence on 21 October 2007 through the merger of the WASG and the “Left Party.PDS North Rhine-Westphalia”, after the two groups had already cooperated in the federal 2005 election, under the name Left Party.PDS (Die Linkspartei.PDS). Many disillusioned former members of the SPD and the Greens became members of the Left, but the majority of members previously belonged to no other party. A significant portion are workers as well as the unemployed and those who remain in poverty under Hartz IV (a German social welfare program).

In 2009, the Left Party participated in its first municipal and federal elections in North Rhine-Westphalia, and after the state elections in May 2010, they entered the Landtag of North Rhine-Westphalia with 5.6% of the vote. Following the 2008 parliamentary elections in Hessen and the 2009 parliamentary elections in Saarland, this marked the third failure of the Left to participate in a state government’s ruling coalition, after several exploratory meetings with the SPD and the Greens fell through.

With around 6,800 members, the North Rhine-Westphalia chapter of the Left is the largest in western Germany, and the third largest overall (as of November 2011).

Positions 
The party has a strong focus on economic and social policy.

The party calls for a changed economic system, in which the areas of public services, social infrastructure, energy and the financial sector are converted into public ownership (which is distinct from state ownership). The Left also wants a strong social safety net that protects against people risking their health or lives because of medical needs or poverty. In addition, the party stands for a proactive labor policy that ensures that regular, well-paid jobs are created and maintained.

With regards to civil society, the Left wants to enact a complete democratization of all areas of life. They see themselves as a feminist party that seeks to realize equality between the sexes, and in foreign politics, they are against military intervention of any kind, as well as for the disarmament and dissolution of NATO. They are extremely opposed to right extremism.

The state association within the party is just as radical. A Südwestrundfunk-broadcast out of Mainz shortly after the 2010 state parliamentary elections noted that seven of the eleven elected members of parliament from the party were also members of “extremist” groups, such as the Socialist Left, the Anticapitalist Left, and the Rote Hilfe. In particular, the broadcast noted that these members were not critical enough of the East German regime backed by the Soviet Union.

Members of Parliament 
Currently, there are 11 members of the North Rhine-Westphalia Left Party in the Bundestag. This number is likely to change as a result of the 2013 German federal election.

After 15 June 2007, the Left has had one person, Rüdiger Sagel, in the Landtag of North Rhine-Westphalia, after Sagel switched his party affiliation from the Greens. Following the 2010 state elections in North Rhine-Westphalia, the state Left Party sent 11 deputies to the state parliament (or ‘’Landtag’’):
 Bärbel Beuermann
 Wolfgang Zimmermann
 Carolin Butterwegge
 Rüdiger Sagel
 Gunhild Böth
 Ralf Michalowsky
 Anna Conrads
 Ali Atalan
 Özlem Alev Demirel
 Michael Aggelidis
 Hamide Akbayir

The Left was elected to many district councils following the district elections of 2009, but in the snap election on 13 May 2012 (held because the Landtag could not agree on the state’s budget), the Left only received 2.5 percent of the vote, and thus failed to garner enough support to clear the five-percent hurdle required to enter parliament. For this reason, they are no longer represented in the state parliament.

Election results

State elections 

1 Party of Democratic Socialism (PDS)
2 Labour and Social Justice – The Electoral Alternative (WASG)

Federal elections 

1 > Party of Democratic Socialism (PDS)
3 Die Linkspartei.PDS

References

External links 
 Homepage von Die Linke Nordrhein-Westfalen
 Landeswahlleiter Nordrhein-Westfalen
 The Left – Opposition or Coalition? Accessed from WDR, 28 February 2010

Politics of North Rhine-Westphalia
The Left (Germany)
State sections of political parties in Germany